Three ballot measures were certified for the November 6, 2018, general election in the state of Massachusetts.

The Constitution of Massachusetts can be amended through initiative, and state statutes can be proposed through initiative. The first and second certified measures, "Nurse-Patient Assignment Limits" and "Advisory Commission for Amendments to the U.S. Constitution Regarding Corporate Personhood and Political Spending", were both initiated state statutes. The third measure, "Gender Identity and Anti-Discrimination", was a veto referendum.

In Massachusetts, after the state determines which measure(s) will appear on the ballot, an official name is assigned to each question. The Secretary of the Commonwealth has discretion over the ordering of questions on the ballot.

Binding statewide questions

VR = veto referendum
ISS = initiated state statute
Vote percentages as of November 8, with 100% reporting

Endorsements

Question 1
On October 23, 2018, The Boston Globe editorial board endorsed a 'no' vote on Question 1, saying the nursing staff ratio is wrong for Massachusetts. On October 26, the Boston Herald also advocated for a 'no' vote. Governor of Massachusetts Charlie Baker said he would vote 'no', while Mayor of Boston Marty Walsh said he would vote 'yes'. A "yes" vote was also advocated by United States Senator for Vermont Bernie Sanders.

Question 3
A 'yes' vote on Question 3 has been "wholeheartedly" endorsed by The Boston Globe in an October 17, 2018, editorial. Actress and LGBT advocate Laverne Cox also advocated for a 'yes' vote.

Removed question
A measure titled "Income Tax for Education and Transportation Amendment", which sought to create a four percent tax on incomes that exceed $1 million, to be used for education and transportation purposes, was removed after the Massachusetts Supreme Judicial Court ruled in June 2018 that the measure had been incorrectly certified by the Massachusetts Attorney General.

Other potential questions
Several additional measures received a required number of signatures by December 6, 2017, but ultimately were not added to the ballot:
 $15 Minimum Wage Initiative
 Paid Family and Medical Leave Initiative
 Sales Tax Decrease and Tax-Free Weekend Initiative

A new law enacting a majority of content from these three measures was signed into law in late June by Governor of Massachusetts Charlie Baker. Hourly minimum wage will be increased from $11 to $15 by 2023, workers will have paid medical leave of 12 to 20 weeks (depending on circumstance), and there will be an annual August sales tax holiday; the state sales tax was not decreased. Initiative organizers agreed to withdraw the associated ballot initiatives.

See also
 Massachusetts ballot measures, 2016
 2020 Massachusetts ballot measures

References

Further reading

External links
 2018 Ballot Questions at sec.state.ma.us
 Initiatives & Other Types of Ballot Questions at mass.gov
 

 
Ballot measures
LGBT rights in the United States